Giovanni Vacca is an Italian physiologist.  He is currently a professor of physiology at the University of Eastern Piedmont, Novara Italy and Dean of the medical school of the same university.

His main research interest is cardiovascular physiology.

Research publications

Fiction

External links

References

Academic staff of the University of Eastern Piedmont
Italian physiologists
Living people
Year of birth missing (living people)